The 2005 National Indoor Football League season was the fifth season of the National Indoor Football League (NIFL). The league champions were the Tri-Cities Fever, who defeated the Rome Renegades in Indoor Bowl V.

Standings

 Green indicates clinched playoff berth
 Purple indicates division champion
 Grey indicates best conference record
*= Despite winning the division, the D.B. Hawgs were unable to play in the playoffs for using an illegal player in a game against the Rome Renegades.

Playoffs

Semifinals
Atlantic Conference
Rome 51, 3-Cincinnati 41

Pacific Conference
 Tri-Cities 41, Odessa 39

Indoor Bowl V
 Tri-Cities 47, Rome 31

External links 
 2005 NIFL Season Stats
 2005 NIFL Summary 
 NIFL Football.com's 2005 Playoff Results

National Indoor Football League seasons
National Indoor Football League Season, 2005